Present day Bangladesh, due to its unique geographic location, suffers from devastating tropical cyclones frequently. The funnel-shaped northern portion of the Bay of Bengal amplifies the storm surge of landfalling tropical cyclones, affecting thousands of people. Some of the most devastating natural disasters in recorded history with high casualties were tropical cyclones that hit the region now comprising present-day Bangladesh. Among them, the 1970 Bhola cyclone alone claimed approximately 300,000 to 500,000 lives, making it the deadliest tropical cyclone on record.

History 
Tropical cyclones affecting Bangladesh have killed about 1.54 million people in the Bengal region.

Bangladesh Space Research and Remote Sensing Organisation (SPARRSO), a government agency under the Ministry of Defence provides storm predictions and early warnings using feeds from NASA and NOAA's satellites. The warnings are usually given in a scale of 10, with 10 being used for the deadliest storms.

A detailed program for storm prevention was outlined by the government following the cyclone of 1991. A Comprehensive Cyclone Preparedness Programme (CPP) is jointly planned, operated, and managed by the Ministry of Disaster Management and Relief and the Bangladesh Red Crescent Society; a volunteer force of more than 32,000 are trained to help in warning and evacuation in the coastal areas. Around 2,500 cyclone shelters have been constructed in the coastal regions. The shelters are built on elevated platforms and serve the dual role of schools or community centers during normal weather. In Patenga, Chittagong, the coast has been heavily protected with concrete levees. Also, afforestation has been initiated in the coastal regions to create a green belt.

Storms

Historical record
Source: SMRC-No.1 – The impact of tropical cyclones on the coastal regions of SAARC countries and their influence in the region, SAARC Meteorological Research Center (SMRC),1998

This is a partial list of the tropical cyclones in Bangladesh or the historical region of Bengal of pre-partitioned India in general. Some of the years and dates may be slightly incorrect. Most of the figures have been taken from Banglapedia.

Modern records 
 1584: A five-hour hurricane and thunderstorm destroyed houses and boats in the coast near Bakerganj (in present-day Patuakhali and Barisal Districts).  Only Hindu temples with a strong foundation were spared. Total casualty: about 200,000.
 1585:  A tropical storm hit the eastern side of Bakerganj (now Barisal) near the mouth of the Meghna River estuary, causing devastation of crops. Casualty: unknown.
 November 1797: A severe cyclone destroyed most of the houses in the Chittagong region. Two ships sank in Chittagong Port.
 May 1822: A cyclone, accompanied by storm surge and tidal bores hit Barisal, Hatiya Island and Noakhali. Casualty: 40,000 people.
 October 1831 Barisal: Casualty: unknown.
 October 1872: A cyclone hit Cox's Bazar. Casualty: unknown.
 31 October 1876: 1876 Bangladesh cyclone with a storm-surge of 12.2 metres (40 ft) hit Meghna River estuary near Chittagong, Barisal, and Noakhali. Casualty: about 200,000. The storm also caused epidemic and famine, and vast property damage.
 24 October 1897 Chittagong: A tropical cyclone accompanied by storm surge hit the area hard, especially near the Kutubdia island.  Casualty: 14,000. The resulting epidemic of Cholera killed another 18,000.
 May 1898 Teknaf: Tropical cyclone with storm surge. Casualty: unknown.
 November 1904 Sonadia: cyclonic storm; 143 killed and fishing fleet wrecked.
 16 October 1909 Khulna: A tropical cyclone accompanied by storm surge. Casualty: 698 people and 70,654 cattle.
 October 1913 Muktagachha upazila (Mymensingh District): A tropical cyclone, having moved inland destroyed villages. Casualty: 500 people.
 24 September 1917 Khulna. A tropical cyclone.  Casualty: 432 people and 28,029 cattle.
 May 1941: A cyclonic storm accompanied by storm-surge hit Eastern Meghna River estuary. Casualty: unknown.
 October 1942: A severe cyclonic storm hit The Sundarbans. Casualty: unknown.
 17–19 May 1948: A cyclonic storm hit the deltan between Chittagong and Noakhali. Casualty: approximately 1,200 people and 20,000 cattle.
 16–19 May 1958: A cyclonic storm accompanied by storm surge hit east and west Meghna River estuary, east of Barisal and Noakhali. Casualty: 870 people and 14,500. Also standing crops were destroyed.
 21–24 October 1958: A cyclonic storm struck Chittagong coast. Effect: Approx. 100,000 families were rendered homeless.
 9–10 October 1960: A severe cyclonic storm hit Eastern Meghna River estuary near Noakhali, Bakerganj, Faridpur and Patuakhali. The storm had wind speeds of up to 201 km/hour. The maximum storm surge was 3.05 metres. It caused devastating damage in Char Jabbar, Char Amina, Char Bhatia, Ramgati, Hatiya and Noakhali. Casualty: 3,000 people. Other effects: 62,725 houses destroyed. Crops on 94,000 acres (380 km2) of land were destroyed.
 30–31 October 1960: A severe cyclonic storm hit Chittagong, Noakhali, Bakerganj, Faridpur, Patuakhali and eastern Meghna estuary, with winds speed up to 210 km/h. The storm surge reached a height of 4.5–6.1 m. Casualty: about 10,000 people, 27,793 cattle . Losses: 568,161 houses destroyed (including 70% houses in Hatiya). Also, two large ocean-going ships ran aground in the shore, and 5–7 vessels capsized in Karnaphuli River.
 9 May 1961: A severe cyclonic storm hit Bagerhat and Khulna. It had wind speeds of up to 161 km/h. The storm surge reached 2.44–3.05 m. Casualty: 11,468 people (mostly in Char Alexander), 25,000 cattle. Damages: The railway tracks between Noakhali and Harinarayanpur were damaged.
 26–30 October 1962: A severe cyclone hit Feni. Maximum windspeed was 161 km/h. The storm surge was 2.5–3.0 m. Casualty: about 1,000 people, many domestic cattle.
 28–29 May 1963: A severe cyclonic storm devastated Chittagong, Noakhali, Cox's Bazar and coastal islands of Sandwip, Kutubdia, Hatiya and Maheshkhali. The storm surge reached 4.3–5.2 m in Chittagong. Maximum windspeed was up to 203 km/h and at Cox's Bazar 164 km/h. Casualty: 11,520 people, 32,617 cattle. Damages: 376,332 houses, 4,787 boats, and standing crops.
 11–12 May 1965: A strong cyclone hit Barisal and Bakerganj. The windspeed reached a maximum of 162 km/h. The storm surge was 3.7 m. Casualty:19,279 people (out of that, 16,456 in Barisal).
 14–15 December 1965: A strong cyclone hit the coast near Cox's Bazar and Patuakhali. The storm surge rose up to 4.7–6.1 m. The windspeed was up to  210 km/h in Cox's Bazar. Casualty" 873 people. Damage: 40,000 salt beds destroyed.
 1 October 1966: A cyclone hit Sandwip, Bakerganj, Khulna, Chittagong, Noakhali and Comilla. Maximum strong surge was 4.7–9.1 m. The maximum wind speed was 146 km/h. Total people affected: 1.5 million people. Casualty: 850 people, 65,000 cattle.
 7–13 November: The 1970 Bhola cyclone hit the entire coast of Bangladesh (then East Pakistan). Most affected were Chittagong, Barguna, Khepupara, Patuakhali, north of Char Burhanuddin, Char Tazumuddin and south of Maijdi, Haringhata. The official death toll was 500,000 but the number is likely to be higher. Damages include destruction of approximately 20,000 fishing boats, and also property and crops. Total loss of cattle reached more than one million. More than 400,000 houses and 3,500 educational institutions were destroyed. Maximum windspeed reached about 222 km/h. Maximum storm surge was about 10.6 m.
 5–6 November 1971: A cyclone hit coastal areas of Chittagong.
 28–30 November 1971: A cyclonic storm hit the coast near the Sundarbans. Maximum wind speed was 97–113 km/h. The storm surge reached 1 m. Low-lying areas of Khulna town inundated.
 6–9 December 1973: The coastal areas near the Sundarbans were hit by a cyclone, accompanied by storm surge. Coastal areas near Patuakhali and nearby islands were submerged under the tidal bore.
 13–15 August 1974: A cyclonic storm hit Khulna. Maximum wind speed reached 80.5 km/h. Casualty:600 people.
 24–28 November 1974: A cyclone struck the coastal areas near Cox's Bazar and Chittagong, including the offshore islands. Maximum wind speed reached 161 km/h. The storm surge was up to 2.8–5.2 m. Casualty: 200 people, 1000 cattle. Damages: 2,300 houses destroyed.
 9–12 May 1975: A strong cyclone pummeled Bhola, Cox's Bazar and Khulna. Maximum wind speed was 96.5 to 112.6 km/h. Casualty: 5 people.
 9–12 May 1977: Khulna, Noakhali, Patuakhali, Barisal, Chittagong and offshore islands were hit by a cyclone. Maximum wind speed was up to 112.63 km/h.
 14–15 October 1983: A strong cyclone hit the coastal islands and chars near Chittagong and Noakhali. Maximum wind speed reached 122 km/h: Casualty: 43 people.  6 fishing boats and a trawler lost, more than 150 fishermen and 100 fishing boats went missing Damages: 20% of the aman rice crops in the affected regions were destroyed.
 5–9 November 1983: A cyclone hit Chittagong, Cox's Bazar coast near Kutubdia, St Martin's Island, Teknaf, Ukhia, Moipong, Sonadia, Barisal, Patuakhali and Noakhali. The maximum wind speed reached 136 km/h. The storm surge was 1.52 m. Casualty:300 fishermen with 50 boats missing. Damages:2,000 houses destroyed.
 24–25 May 1985: A severe cyclone hit Chittagong, Cox's Bazar, Noakhali and coastal islands (Sandwip, Hatiya, and Urirchar). Maximum wind speed at Chittagong was 154 km/h, at Sandwip was 140 km/h, at Cox's Bazar was 100 km/h. The storm surge reached a height of 3.0–4.6 m. Casualty:11,069 people, 135,033 cattle. Damages: 94,379 houses and 74 km of road, and embankments destroyed.
 8–9 November 1986: A severe cyclonic storm hit the coastal island and chars near Chittagong, Barisal, Patuakhali and Noakhali. Maximum windspeed was 110 km/h at Chittagong and 90 km/h at Khulna. Casualty: 14 people. Damages: 972 km2 of paddy fields were inundated; Schools, mosques, warehouses, hospitals, houses and buildings were destroyed at Amtali upazila in Barguna District.
 24–30 November 1988: A severe cyclonic storm Cyclone 04B struck Jessore, Kushtia, Faridpur and coastal islands of Barisal and Khulna. The maximum windspeed was 162 km/h. The storm was accompanied by a  storm surge of 4.5 m at Mongla Port. Casualty: 5,708 people, and numerous wild animals at The Sundarbans (deer 15,000, royal Bengal tiger 9), cattle 65,000. Total damage to crops reached Taka 9.41 billion.
18 December 1990: The remnant tropical depression of Severe Cyclonic Storm BOB 09/04B made landfall on 18 December near Cox's Bazar, however, there were no reports of any impact in association with the system.
 29–30 April 1991: The 1991 Bangladesh cyclone hit Bangladesh late 29 April night. The storm originated in the Indian Ocean and reached the Bay of Bengal coast after 20 days. The diameter of the storm was close to 600 km. The maximum wind speed (observed at Sandwip) reached 225 km/h. At other places, the maximum wind speed was reported as follows: Chittagong 160 km/h, Khepupara (Kalapara) 180 km/h, Kutubdia 180 km/h, Cox's Bazar 185 km/h, and Bhola 178 km/h. (The NOAA-11 satellite estimated the maximum wind speed to be about 240 km/h at 1.38 pm on 29 April). The storm made landfall near the coast north of Chittagong port during the night of the 29 April. The maximum storm surge height reached about 5 to 8 m. Casualty: 150,000 people, 70,000 cattle. Damages: loss of property was estimated at about Tk 60 billion.
 31 May-2 June 1991: A cyclone hit the coastal islands and chars near Patuakhali, Barisal, Noakhali and Chittagong. Maximum wind speed reached 110 km/h. The storm surge was 1.9 m.
 29 April-3 May 1994: A severe cyclonic storm hit the coastal islands near Cox's Bazar. Maximum windspeed reached 210 km/h. Casualty: 400 people, 8,000 cattle.
 21–25 November 1995: A severe cyclonic storm hit the coastal islands near Cox's Bazar. The maximum wind speed was up to 210 km/h. Casualty: 650 people, 17,000 cattle.
 16–19 May 1997: May 1997 Bangladesh cyclone hit the coastal islands and chars near Chittagong, Cox's Bazar, Noakhali and Bhola districts. The maximum wind speed was 225 km/hour, and the storm surge reached 3.05 metres. Casualty:  126 people.
 25–27 September 1997: A severe cyclonic storm hit coastal islands near  Chittagong, Cox's Bazar, Noakhali and Bhola. It had wind speeds of up to 150 km/hour, and a storm surge of 1.83 to 3.05 metres.
 16–20 May 1998 A severe cyclonic storm with windspeed of 150 km/hour struck coastal islands near Chittagong, Cox's Bazar, and Noakhali. The storm surge was from 1.83 to 2.44 metres.
 19–22 November 1998: A cyclonic storm, with wind speeds up to 90 km/hour, and a storm surge of 1.22 to 2.44 metres hit coastal islands and sand shoals near Khulna, Barisal, and Patuakhali.
 14–15 May 2007: Cyclone Akash struck about 115 km south of Chittagong with wind speeds up to 120 km/hour. 14 people were killed and damages amounted to US$982 million.
 15 November 2007: cyclone Sidr with wind speeds up to 260 km/hour, made landfall on southern Bangladesh, causing over 3,500 deaths and severe damage.
 26–27 October 2008: Cyclone Rashmi made landfall on the Bangladesh coast late on 26 October with wind speeds up to 85 km/hour, 15 people were killed and thousands of homes were also damaged.
 19–21 April 2009: Cyclone Bijli attacked weakly in Bangladesh and not so severe damages were recorded except some houses and crop fields losses.
 27–29 May 2009: A severe Cyclone Aila attacked offshore 15 districts of south-western part of Bangladesh with wind speeds up to 120 km/hour; about 150 persons killed, 2 lac houses and 3 lac acres of cultivated land and crops losses.
 16–17 May 2013: Cyclone Viyaru, formerly known as Cyclonic Storm Mahasen, hit near Chittagong with wind speeds up to 85 km/hour. 17 people died, and nearly 1.3 million were affected across the country. Losses to crops exceeded US$35.3 million.
 29 July 2015: Cyclone Komen with wind speeds up to 75 km/hour, Komen made landfall near Chittagong. About 510,000 houses in the country were damaged or destroyed, and many residents lost their source of income as 667,221 acres (270,000 ha) of crop fields were damaged. The floods killed 132 people, of which at least 39 were directly related to Komen.
 21 May 2016: Cyclone Roanu made landfall near Chittagong killing 26 people in Bangladesh. It has wind speeds up to 100 km/hour. Around 40,000 homesteads and business houses were damaged. Food storage, seasonal crops were damaged. Livestock, including fish and shrimp firms were swept away.
 20 August 2016: The remnants of Tropical Storm Dianmu affected Bangladesh, no damage or death were reported.
 29–31 May 2017: Cyclone Mora with wind speeds up to 110 km/hour, made landfall near Chittagong. A total of 500,000 people managed to move out of coastal areas before the storm made landfall on 31 May. A multitude of tropical cyclone warnings and watches were issued for much of southern Bangladesh and the districts of Northeast India. Strong winds and storm surge battered buildings and destroyed farmlands across Chittagong, Cox's Bazar, and Rangamati, with at least 20,000 houses damaged in refugee camps for Rohingya Muslims displaced by conflict in neighbouring Myanmar. As of 31 May, eighteen people were reported to be killed across Bangladesh, mostly due to falling trees and drowning.
 4 May 2019: Cyclone Fani moved into Bangladesh after making landfall in Odisha. It killed 17 people in ten districts of Bangladesh. It destroyed about 63,000 ha (160,000 acres) of farmland in 35 districts of the country, the agricultural loss were at ৳385 million (US$4.6 million). Total damage in Bangladesh were up to ৳5.36 billion (US$63.6 million).
 9 November 2019: Cyclones Matmo and Bulbul made landfall near West Bengal, and crossed into Bangladesh. It caused severe flooding and storm surge in the country, with approximately 72,000 metric tons of crops being lost, with a total value of Tk 2.6 billion (US$31 million).
 20 May 2020: Cyclone Amphan moved into Bangladesh after making landfall in nearby West Bengal.
 26 May 2021: Cyclone Yaas hit Bangladesh after causing a lot of damages and destructions in India. Before hitting, strong tidal waves damaged many coastal structures, dames and jetties.
 24 October: Cyclone Sitrang made landfall near Bhola killing 35 people in Bangladesh. It has wind speeds up to 85 km/hour.

See also

 List of notable tropical cyclones
 List of disasters in Bangladesh by death toll

References

 
Bangladesh
Tropical cyclones